Brian Hayes (born 23 August 1969) is a former Irish Fine Gael politician who served as a Minister of State from 2011 to 2014, Leader of the Opposition in the Seanad and Leader of Fine Gael in the Seanad from 2002 to 2007. He served as a Member of the European Parliament (MEP) for the Dublin constituency from 2014 to 2019. He was as a Teachta Dála (TD) for the Dublin South-West constituency from 1997 to 2002 and 2007 to 2014. He was also a Senator from 1995 to 1997, after being nominated by the Taoiseach and from 2002 to 2007 for the Cultural and Educational Panel.

Early life
Hayes was born in Dublin. He was educated at Garbally College, Ballinasloe, County Galway; St Patrick's College, Maynooth, from which he received a degree in history and sociology in 1991, and Trinity College Dublin. Formerly a secondary school teacher, he was a member of South Dublin County Council between 1995 and 2003.

Political career
Before joining Fine Gael Hayes had been a member of Democratic Left, a party which he joined because of the hardline anti-Provisional IRA and anti-Irish Republican policies of its leader Proinsias de Rossa. He subsequently joined Fine Gael for similar reasons, this time inspired by the anti-Sinn Féin stance of that party's then leader, John Bruton. In December 1995, he was Nominated by the Taoiseach, John Bruton, to the 20th Seanad, where he was appointed government spokesperson on the Environment. Hayes was first elected to Dáil Éireann at the 1997 general election for the Dublin South-West constituency. He was appointed Fine Gael spokesperson on Housing, House Prices and Urban Renewal.

In a reshuffle of the Fine Gael front bench in June 2000, Hayes was promoted as spokesperson on Northern Ireland. Between 2001 and 2002 he served as Fine Gael's spokesperson on Social and Community Affairs. Hayes lost his seat at the 2002 general election but was elected to Seanad Éireann, where he served as Fine Gael Seanad leader and spokesperson on Defence and Northern Ireland.

At the 2007 general election he was re-elected to the Dáil on the first count in the Dublin South-West constituency. He was party spokesperson for Education and Science from 2007 to 2010.

On 19 August 2008, Hayes used a report in the Irish Independent to say that immigrant children should be "segregated" until their English language skills match those of native children. His comments generated considerable debate in the days that followed. The Irish National Teachers' Organisation (INTO) described the idea put forward by Hayes as "discriminatory, inequitable and deeply flawed". He later apologized and spoke of his regret but insisted this "should not take away from the substance of what I said".

In June 2010, he supported Richard Bruton's leadership challenge to Enda Kenny. Following Kenny's victory in a motion of confidence, Hayes was not re-appointed to the front bench. In October 2010, he was appointed as party Deputy spokesperson on Finance with special responsibility for Public Expenditure.

Ministerial career (2011–14)
On 10 March 2011, Hayes was appointed by the Fine Gael–Labour government on the nomination of Taoiseach Enda Kenny as Minister of State at the Department of Finance and at the Department of Public Expenditure and Reform with responsibility for Public Service Reform and the Office of Public Works.

After sudden floods killed two people in October 2011, he claimed the response of local authorities was "not adequate". In a newspaper article for the Sunday Independent in March 2012, one year after the Irish people voted to remove them from office, Hayes claimed Ireland still needed Fianna Fáil and questioned if their absence would be "in the interests of Irish democracy".

While in the position of Minister of State at the Department of Finance he sought to improve the domestic economy by focusing more intensively on domestic sectors likely to lead to job creation. This included initiatives such as the expansion of Aspen Pharma to Citywest, the opening of Charles River Managed Services in Citywest, and the launch of Paycheck Plus’ UK branch.

Hayes publicly acknowledged that Ireland had suffered reputational damage following the death of Savita Halappanavar, the pregnant Indian woman who died after being denied an abortion at University Hospital Galway.

European Parliament
He was elected as the Fine Gael candidate for the Dublin constituency at the 2014 European Parliament election, terminating his appointment as Minister of State. Hayes was the lead negotiator for the European People's Party (EPP) on the plan for a Pan-European Pension Product (PEPP). On 6 November 2018, Hayes announced that he was leaving politics and would not contest the European Parliament election in 2019. He is currently Chief Executive of Banking & Payment Federation Ireland.

Oireachtas Golf Society scandal
In August 2020, Hayes became one of the figures of the Oireachtas Golf Society scandal ("Golfgate"), a scandal created when members of the Oireachtas Golf Society were discovered to have breached the rules set down by the Irish government about gathering during the COVID-19 Pandemic.

References

External links
Brian Hayes' page on the VoteWatch website

1969 births
Living people
Alumni of Trinity College Dublin
Alumni of St Patrick's College, Maynooth
Fine Gael MEPs
Fine Gael TDs
Irish schoolteachers
Local councillors in South Dublin (county)
Members of the 20th Seanad
Members of the 22nd Seanad
Members of the 28th Dáil
Members of the 30th Dáil
Members of the 31st Dáil
MEPs for the Republic of Ireland 2014–2019
Ministers of State of the 31st Dáil
Nominated members of Seanad Éireann
Fine Gael senators
People educated at Garbally College